G. spinosa may refer to:
 Garra spinosa, a ray-finned fish species in the genus Garra
 Geoffraea spinosa, a poisonous flowering plant species in the genus Geoffraea
 Grayia spinosa, a small, multibranched, brambly shrub species
 Grevillea spinosa, an evergreen flowering plant species in the genus Grevillea
 Gypsophila spinosa, a herbaceous flowering plant species

See also
 Spinosa (disambiguation)